Małgorzata Hołub-Kowalik (born 30 October 1992) is a Polish sprinter specialising in the 400 metres. She won two medals at the 2020 Summer Olympics, gold with Polish mixed 4 × 400 metres relay team and silver as a member of women's 4 × 400 metres relay team.

Hołub-Kowalik represented her country at two outdoor and two indoor World Championships winning a silver medal in the relay at the 2016 IAAF World Indoor Championships. 

Her personal bests in the event are 51.18 seconds outdoors (Lublin 2018) and 52.57 seconds indoors (Toruń 2018).

Competition record

References

External links
 

1992 births
Living people
Polish female sprinters
People from Koszalin
World Athletics Championships athletes for Poland
World Athletics Championships medalists
Athletes (track and field) at the 2016 Summer Olympics
Athletes (track and field) at the 2020 Summer Olympics
Olympic athletes of Poland
Universiade medalists in athletics (track and field)
Universiade gold medalists for Poland
Universiade silver medalists for Poland
Polish Athletics Championships winners
World Athletics Indoor Championships medalists
Medalists at the 2015 Summer Universiade
Medalists at the 2017 Summer Universiade
European Athletics Indoor Championships winners
Medalists at the 2020 Summer Olympics
Olympic gold medalists in athletics (track and field)
Olympic silver medalists in athletics (track and field)
Olympic gold medalists for Poland
Olympic silver medalists for Poland
20th-century Polish women
21st-century Polish women
European Athletics Championships winners